Widad Sportive de Temara is a Moroccan football club currently playing in the second division. The club was founded in 1993 and is located in the town of Témara. Stade Yacoub El Mansour, which has 5,000 capacity, is their home.

References

Football clubs in Morocco
1993 establishments in Morocco
Sports clubs in Morocco
Association football clubs established in 1993
Rabat-Salé-Kénitra